The 1980 Western Australian state election was held on 23 February 1980.

Retiring Members

Labor

Tom Evans MLA (Kalgoorlie)
John Troy MLA (Fremantle)
Don Cooley MLC (North-East Metropolitan)
Claude Stubbs MLC (South-East)

Liberal

Des O'Neil MLA (East Melville)
George Berry MLC (Lower North)

Independent

Ron Thompson MLC (South Metropolitan) – elected as Labor

Legislative Assembly
Sitting members are shown in bold text. Successful candidates are highlighted in the relevant colour. Where there is possible confusion, an asterisk (*) is also used.

Legislative Council

Sitting members are shown in bold text. Successful candidates are highlighted in the relevant colour. Where there is possible confusion, an asterisk (*) is also used.

See also
 Members of the Western Australian Legislative Assembly, 1977–1980
 Members of the Western Australian Legislative Assembly, 1980–1983
 Members of the Western Australian Legislative Council, 1977–1980
 Members of the Western Australian Legislative Council, 1980–1983
 1980 Western Australian state election

References
 

Candidates for Western Australian state elections